Lyn Fotball Damer is the women's football branch of Lyn Fotball. The team plays in Toppserien, the top division of women's football in Norway.

Lyn formed a women's team in the fifth tier 4. divisjon in 2009. The team promoted to the second tier in 2012, their third consecutive promotion. In 2017, after five seasons spent in 1. divisjon, Lyn promoted to the 2018 Toppserien. The team finished their first top tier season in eleventh place, and became tenth in the 2019 season.

Lyn Fotball Damer play their home games at Kringsjå kunstgress, a stadium which was renovated in 2016.

Players

Current squad

Former players

Recent seasons 
{|class="wikitable"
|-bgcolor="#efefef"
! Season
! 
! Pos.
! Pl.
! W
! D
! L
! GS
! GA
! P
!Cup
!Notes
!
|-
|2015 
|1. divisjon
|align=right | 5
|align=right|22||align=right|12||align=right|2||align=right|8
|align=right|59||align=right|38||align=right|38
||Second round
|
|
|-
|2016 
|1. divisjon
|align=right | 2
|align=right|22||align=right|15||align=right|3||align=right|4
|align=right|63||align=right|28||align=right|48
|Second round 
|
|
|-
|2017 
|1. divisjon
|align=right bgcolor=#DDFFDD| 1
|align=right|22||align=right|15||align=right|4||align=right|3
|align=right|43||align=right|16||align=right|49
|Third round
|Promoted to Toppserien
|
|-
|2018 
|Toppserien
|align=right | 11
|align=right|22||align=right|3||align=right|3||align=right|16
|align=right|27||align=right|56||align=right|12
||Third round
|
|
|-
|2019 
|Toppserien
|align=right| 10
|align=right|22||align=right|4||align=right|8||align=right|10
|align=right|23||align=right|37||align=right|20
|Second round
|
|
|-
|2020
|Toppserien
|align=right| 6
|align=right|18||align=right|6||align=right|3||align=right|9
|align=right|24||align=right|30||align=right|21
|First Round
|
|
|-
|2021
|Toppserien
|align=right| 9
|align=right|18||align=right|3||align=right|3||align=right|12
|align=right|19||align=right|34||align=right|12
|Second Round
|
|
|}

Honours
1. divisjon
Winners: 2017

References

Lyn Fotball
Women's football clubs in Norway
Football clubs in Oslo